Infant Formula Act of 1980, 21 U.S.C. § 350a, is an United States statute authorizing good manufacturing practices and infant food safety for infant formula packaged and labeled in the United States. The Act of Congress amended the Federal Food, Drug, and Cosmetic Act creating section 350a under subchapter IV entitled as Food.

The United States administrative law endorsed a nutrient composition standard promoting human nutrition. The neonatal nutritive composition was incipiently affirmed by the American Academy of Pediatrics in 1967. The infant formula standard proposal orchestrated regulatory provisions for adequate nutrient levels as suitable for toddler nutrition.

The H.R. 6940 bill was passed by the 96th U.S. Congressional session and signed into law by U.S. President Jimmy Carter on September 26, 1980.

FDA Nutritive Fortification of Federal Register

FDA Infant Formula Supplemental Articles

References

See also

External links
 
 
 
 

1980 in American law
96th United States Congress
Food and Drug Administration
Food safety in the United States
Public health in the United States
United States federal health legislation